Kamakshi Sivaramakrishnan is a co-founder of the American company Drawbridge. Sivaramakrishnan is a member of the board of directors of the American company LiveRamp.

Life 
Sivaramakrishnan grew up in Bombay. She worked for AdMob.

She holds a PhD from Stanford University. In 2015, she co founded Drawbridge. which was bought by Linkedin.

Recognition 
Sivaramakrishnan was included in Forbes 2018 list of America's Top 50 Women in Tech.

References 

Year of birth missing (living people)
Living people
Stanford University alumni
21st-century American businesswomen
21st-century American businesspeople
Indian emigrants to the United States